Aberdeen Stadium may refer to:

Aberdeen Regent Park Greyhound Stadium, a former greyhound stadium and now the Chris Anderson Stadium.
Holburn Stadium (also known as Aberdeen Greyhound Stadium), a former greyhound racing stadium from 1933 to 1969.
Pittodrie Stadium, an all-seater stadium in Aberdeen, primarily for football and home of Aberdeen F.C.,
Proposed Aberdeen stadium, a football stadium under construction in Kingswells, called Kingsford Stadium.